Gemma Jones (born 7 January 1994) is a New Zealand sailor.

Sailing career
Jones represented New Zealand at the 2012 and 2013 International Sailing Federation youth world championships, competing in the 420 and SL 16 catamaran classes.

At the 2016 Summer Olympics, Jones competed alongside Jason Saunders in the Nacra 17 event. Jones and Saunders finished fourth in the 2015 Nacra World Championships.

Personal life
Her father, Murray, was an America's Cup sailor. He has won the Americas Cup 5 times and has been inducted into the Hall of Fame. Her mother Jan Shearer is a triple Olympian who won a silver medal at the 1992 Games in Barcelona in the 470 W Yachting Class.

References

Living people
New Zealand female sailors (sport)
Olympic sailors of New Zealand
Sailors at the 2016 Summer Olympics – Nacra 17
1994 births